The 1969 Wills Open British Covered Court Championships was a combined men's and women's tennis tournament played on indoor carpet courts. It was the second edition of the British Indoor Championships in the Open era. The tournament took place at the  Queens Club and Wembley Arena in London, England and ran from 17 November through 22 November 1969.

The men's singles event and the £3,000 first prize was won by first seeded Rod Laver while Ann Jones, also seeded first, won the women's singles title and the accompanying £1,300 first-prize money.

Finals

Men's singles

 Rod Laver defeated  Tony Roche 6–4, 6–1, 6–3

Women's singles
 Ann Jones defeated  Billie Jean King 9–11, 6–2, 9–7

Men's doubles
 Roy Emerson /  Rod Laver defeated  Pancho Gonzales /  Bob Hewitt 5–7, 6–3, 6–4, 6–3

Women's doubles
 Ann Jones /  Virginia Wade defeated  Rosie Casals /  Billie Jean King  6–2, 6–4

References

External links 
 ITF tournament edition details

Wembley Championships
Wills Open British Covered Court Championships
Wills Open British Covered Court Championships
Wills Open British Covered Court Championships
November 1969 sports events in the United Kingdom
Tennis in London